Behavior Cemetery is a historic cemetery on Sapelo Island outside Hog Hammock, Georgia.

History
The African-American cemetery is believed to date to before the American Civil War although the earliest marker is dated to the late 19th century. Originally the cemetery was associated with a former community named "Behavior" and of the people enslaved by Thomas Spalding.  

An example of African-American burial grounds, the cemetery's grave markers include short posts at either end of the graves with epitaphs on wooden boards nailed to the surrounding trees and personal items included with the deceased. More recent tombstones are cement, granite or metal. , the cemetery is still in use and the only cemetery associated with the African American community on Sapelo Island.

The age of the cemetery is unknown, but there was damage recorded from the October 2, 1898 hurricane

It was added to the National Register of Historic Places on August 22, 1996. 

In June of 2010, professors and students from University of Tennessee at Chattanooga conducted a survey of the cemetery. Their work and excavations showed evidence of over 180 unmarked graves and at least two structures, one likely a cabin for the enslaved people.

See also
 National Register of Historic Places listings in McIntosh County, Georgia

References

External links
 
 Behavior Cemetery, Vanishing Coastal Georgia
 Burial List, List of burials found at Behavior Cemetery

African-American history of Georgia (U.S. state)
Cemeteries on the National Register of Historic Places in Georgia (U.S. state)
Geography of McIntosh County, Georgia
African-American cemeteries
National Register of Historic Places in McIntosh County, Georgia